Cătălina Ponor (born 20 August 1987) is a Romanian former artistic gymnast who competed at three Olympiads: 2004, 2012, and 2016. She won three gold medals at the 2004 Summer Olympics in Athens on balance beam, floor and as part of the Romanian team. She also earned a silver medal on floor and bronze medal as part of the Romanian team at the 2012 Summer Olympics in London, as well as multiple World Championship and European Championship medals. She announced her plans to retire from gymnastics after the 2017 Artistic Gymnastics World Championships, in Montreal. During her career, she won 23 Olympic, World and European medals. More than half of them (12) were gold medals. She was inducted into the International Gymnastics Hall of Fame in 2022.

Early life
Ponor was born in Constanța and started gymnastics when she was four years old. In 2002, she was discovered training in Constanța by the Romanian national team coaches, Octavian Bellu and Mariana Bitang, who invited her to join the national team.

Senior gymnastics career

2003–2004
Ponor made her international debut at the 2003 World Artistic Gymnastics Championships in Anaheim, California, where the Romanian team finished in second place. Individually, she won silver medals on balance beam, scoring 9.587, and floor, scoring 9.700. In November, she competed at the Artistic Gymnastics World Cup event in Stuttgart, Germany, where she placed first on balance beam (9.587) and third on floor (9.237).

In March 2004, Ponor competed at the World Cup event in Cottbus, Germany. She placed first on balance beam, scoring 9.700, and second on floor, scoring 9.575. Later in March, she competed at the World Cup event in Lyon, France, and won silver medals on balance beam and floor, scoring 9.175 and 9.625 respectively.

At the beginning of May, she helped Romania win the team competition at the European Women's Artistic Gymnastics Championships in Amsterdam. In event finals, she once again placed first on balance beam (9.725) and floor (9.637).

Athens Olympics
In August, Ponor competed at the 2004 Summer Olympics in Athens. She contributed scores of 9.412 on vault, 9.762 on balance beam, and 9.750 on floor toward the Romanian team's first-place finish. In event finals, she won gold medals on balance beam (9.787) and floor (9.750). She called the results "a dream that came true. ... When I won the gold medal on balance beam, I was very emotional. I had wished to win that medal forever."

Ponor was the first female gymnast since Daniela Silivaș in 1988 to win three gold medals at a single Olympics.

2005–2007

Ponor competed at the European Championships in Debrecen, Hungary, in June 2005. She placed first on balance beam with a score of 9.737 and fourth on floor with a score of 9.200. That fall, she won a bronze medal on beam (9.500) at the 2005 World Championships in Melbourne.

In March 2006, she competed at the Cottbus World Cup and placed sixth in the floor final with a score of 13.250. The following month, at the European Championships in Volos, Greece, she placed first on balance beam (15.800) and third on floor (14.600).

In 2007, Ponor began training with Mariana Bitang again. She said: "She's the only person who can bring me back to the form I was in. She's the only coach who can guide me to a world title and another Olympic title." Bitang added, "We saw her very determined, and we were very surprised to see her appetite for competition."

In July, Ponor competed at the Romanian National Championships in Ploiesti, Romania. She placed first on vault with a score of 15.062 and first on balance beam with a score of 16.500.

In September, Ponor competed at the 2007 World Championships in Stuttgart. She helped the Romanian team place third and individually she placed fourth in the balance beam final with a score of 15.700.

In December, Ponor retired due to ongoing injuries.

2011
In March, Ponor began training again with the Romanian national team under the newly returned coaches Octavian Bellu and Mariana Bitang.

At the beginning of August, Ponor had a minor medical procedure to correct a congenital heart defect that was causing an arrhythmia and was able to resume training the same week. She said, "I had a congenital problem I was born with, but I went to the doctor and all is well."

At the end of August, Ponor competed at the Romanian National Championships in Onesti, Romania. She placed second on balance beam scoring 15.775 and third on floor scoring 14.625.

In October, Ponor competed at the 2011 World Championships in Tokyo. She contributed scores of 14.933 on vault, 15.166 on balance beam, and 14.633 on floor towards the Romanian team's fourth-place finish and individually she placed seventh in the balance beam final with a score of 14.241.

2012
In March, Ponor competed at the Artistic Gymnastics World Cup event in Doha, Qatar. She placed first on balance beam with a score of 15.300 and first on floor with a score of 15.275. Ponor said, "I want to do the same thing that I did in 2004. It was hard to make a comeback, but all the time I was thinking that I could do it. I will not relax till I reach my goal."

In April, Ponor competed at an international meet against France in Cholet, France. She contributed scores of 14.900 on vault and 15.550 on balance beam towards the Romanian team's first-place finish.

Later in April, Ponor competed at an international meet against Germany and the United Kingdom in Ulm, Germany. She contributed scores of 14.750 on vault, 15.100 on balance beam, and 14.900 on floor toward the Romanian team's first-place finish.

In May, Ponor competed at the 2012 European Championships in Brussels. She contributed scores of 15.033 on vault, 15.433 on balance beam, and 14.733 on floor towards the Romanian team's first-place finish. In event finals, she placed first on beam scoring 15.300 and second on floor scoring 14.633. Bellu said, "You saw the reaction of the fans. A triple Olympic champion gets respect, especially if she performs like this." She is the gymnast who has won the most balance beam titles at the European Championships: 2004, 2005, 2006, 2012 and 2017.

In June, Ponor competed at the World Cup event in Ghent, Belgium. She won the balance beam event final with a score of 15.025.

At the beginning of July, Ponor competed at an international meet against France, Germany, and Italy in Bucharest, Romania. She contributed scores of 15.000 on vault, 15.700 on balance beam, and 15.000 on floor toward the Romanian team's first-place finish.

London Olympics

At the end of July, Ponor competed at the 2012 Summer Olympics in London. She helped the Romanian team qualify to the team final in fourth place, and individually, she qualified eighth to the balance beam final with a score of 15.033, and seventh to the floor final, despite botching her third tumbling pass, with a score of 14.600. In the team final, she contributed scores of 15.100 on vault, 15.416 on balance beam, and 14.800 on floor toward the Romanian team's third-place finish. She earned the highest score on balance beam during the team competition.

In event finals, Ponor placed fourth on beam (15.066) and second on floor (15.200). On beam, she originally was placed in third, but after American Aly Raisman had an inquiry accepted about her difficulty score, they finished in a tie. Ultimately however, after a tie-breaking procedure which prioritized execution score, Raisman was awarded the bronze medal. Ponor said, "I will say it again, and I want everyone to know, I will quit without regrets. I have worked every second for my team, I have worked every second for myself, I have worked every second for everybody. I have already been an Olympic champion. I will quit gymnastics with my chin up."

2015
In February 2015, Ponor registered for the anti-doping control within the International Federation of Gymnastics, which suggested that she might be returning to competition. She officially announced her comeback in early March. She told WOGymnastika that by coming back for a third time, she will be risking her biggest failure. She could not compete in the 2015 European Games in Baku as she was not eligible yet.

In September, Ponor made her return in competition by competing in a friendly meet between Romania and France where she helped the Romanian team place first.

2016
In June 2016, Ponor won two bronze medals at the European Championships. On 6 July, she was selected to represent Romania at the 2016 Summer Olympics, despite Larisa Iordache's achievement of her fourth consecutive national all around title and citing injury concerns on Iordache. This announcement was made shortly after Ponor was named as Romania's flag bearer for the opening ceremonies, the first time this honor was given to a gymnast. In the qualification stage, she placed fifth on the balance beam. She placed seventh in the beam final.

2017
Ponor continued to compete in 2017 in the hopes of participating in the European Championships, since Romania was the host this year. She began the year by winning titles on the balance beam and floor exercise at the Baku World Cup. One week later, on 23 March, she won a silver medal on beam at the Doha World Cup.

At the European Championships in Cluj-Napoca, Romania, Ponor competed on beam and floor. She missed the floor final because her routine lacked a front tumbling connection, a requirement. However, she qualified to the beam final and won the gold medal emotionally in front of a noisy and appreciative home crowd.

In October 2017, Ponor competed at the 2017 Artistic Gymnastics World Championships in Montreal. Competing only in qualifications on beam, placing 26th,  and floor, placing 14th. Ponor did not qualify to either event finals after a fall on beam, earning her a 12.233, and a step out of bounds on floor, earning her a 13.266.

Following her competition at the 2017 Mexico Open in Mexico City, Mexico, where she won a silver medal in the 3-event all-around, Ponor announced her official retirement from competitive gymnastics for the third time.

Personal life
Ponor was in a relationship with Puerto Rican gymnast Tommy Ramos from 2012 until 2016. As of June 18, 2022, she is married to Romanian actor and director Bogdan Jianu. On her 35th birthday, Ponor revealed on Instagram, that she and Jianu were expecting their first child together. On December 29, 2022, Ponor gave birth to a baby boy. She announced the Romanian jury points in the final of Eurovision Song Contest 2021.

Competitive history

See also

List of Olympic female gymnasts for Romania
List of Olympic medal leaders in women's gymnastics

References

External links

 
 
 
 
 

1987 births
Living people
Sportspeople from Constanța
Romanian female artistic gymnasts
Olympic gymnasts of Romania
Olympic gold medalists for Romania
Olympic silver medalists for Romania
Olympic bronze medalists for Romania
Olympic medalists in gymnastics
Gymnasts at the 2004 Summer Olympics
Gymnasts at the 2012 Summer Olympics
Gymnasts at the 2016 Summer Olympics
Medalists at the 2004 Summer Olympics
Medalists at the 2012 Summer Olympics
Medalists at the World Artistic Gymnastics Championships
European champions in gymnastics